Stolas: Book of Angels Volume 12 is an album by the Masada Quintet featuring Joe Lovano performing compositions from John Zorn's Masada Book Two.  This is the first known recording by the Masada Quintet.

Reception

The Allmusic review by Thom Jurek states: "Zorn has become a prolific composer of film scores and string quartets, and he writes for any number of other configurations as one of the most in-demand composers in the world. All of that is born out on Stolas, the single most beautiful album in the Book of Angels series so far – and, one might argue, in the entirety of the Masada catalog". On All About Jazz George Kanzler noted "this is a group with more than a passing resemblance to the classic '50s quintets of Miles Davis, Shorty Rogers, Horace Silver and Clifford Brown/Max Roach. Like those ensembles, the material is approached with a composer/arranger or leader's sensibility, each tune evoking and sustaining a particular mood, one often set by the tempo and rhythm, although seemingly dominated by improvised solos".

Track listing
All compositions by John Zorn.

 "Haamiah" – 4:20
 "Rikbiel" – 5:48
 "Psisya" – 8:26
 "Sartael" – 4:51
 "Tashriel" – 4:03
 "Rahtiel" – 7:56
 "Tagriel" – 13:30
 "Serakel" – 5:09
 "Rigal" – 8:59
Recorded at Avatar Studios in New York City on 22 February 2009

Personnel
Dave Douglas – trumpet
Joe Lovano – tenor saxophone
Uri Caine – piano
Greg Cohen – bass
Joey Baron - drums
John Zorn – alto saxophone (on track 6)

References

2009 albums
Albums produced by John Zorn
Book of Angels albums
Tzadik Records albums
Masada (band) albums